Frank Barrett (—13 April 1931)) was an Irish Republican Army (IRA) officer during the Irish War of Independence and a commander of the anti-Treaty IRA 1st Western Division during the Irish Civil War.

References

External links
 

1931 deaths
Irish Republican Army (1919–1922) members
Irish Republican Army (1922–1969) members
People of the Irish Civil War (Anti-Treaty side)
People from County Clare
1890s births